Can't Wake Up is the fifth studio album by American musician Shakey Graves. It was released in May 2018 under Dualtone Records.

Track listing

Charts

References

2018 albums
Dualtone Records albums